Wang Hui (born 1978) is a female Chinese former international table tennis player.

She won a bronze medal at the 1997 World Table Tennis Championships in the women's doubles with Cheng Hongxia and a gold medal at the 2000 World Team Table Tennis Championships.

See also
 List of table tennis players

References

Chinese female table tennis players
Living people
Table tennis players from Harbin
World Table Tennis Championships medalists
Year of birth missing (living people)
Japanese sportspeople of Chinese descent